The  Casa dei Tre Oci or Casa di Maria is a modern, neo-gothic palace located in the island of Giudecca of the sestiere of Dorsoduro, in Venice. The facade is visible across the Giudecca Canal from the Church of the Zitelle.

History
La Casa dei Tre Oci was designed in 1912-1913 by the Bolognese painter Mario de Maria as his own house. It is stated that the symbolism of the facade is that the three large windows represent Maria's immediate family: his son, wife, and himself, while the smaller upper window represents his then daughter Silvia, who had recently died in her youth. The Italian term for eye (occhi) in Venetian dialect is òci, hence the house's name. 

After the Maria family the palace was occupied for a spell by the architect Renzo Piano. In 2016, the house is owned by Polymnia Venezia srl, a cultural institution promoting twentieth century art. In the 1960s Fulbright scholars Wolf Kahn, Richard Miller and William Eddelman  lived and worked in the building. During those years it was known as the Casa de Maria. Many noted painters lived and worked there, including Friedensreich Hundertwasser and his wife as well as Pegeen Vail Guggenheim. Miss Berheimer, who was an assistant to Max Reinhardt also resided there. There were several separate apartments and art studios. At one time, the top floor was used by the American Consulate. The historic gondola, once in the lobby, is now in the Venice Arsenale Museum.

The Fondazione di Venezia acquired the building in 2000 and reopened it in 2012 post-refurbishment as a gallery for photography exhibitions. In 2021, Nicolas Berggruen signed a preliminary agreement to purchase the building, with plans to use the space to host symposia, workshops and exhibitions in partnership with major museums.

Gallery

Bibliography
 Guida d'Italia – Venezia. 3a ed. Milano, Touring Editore, 2007. .
 Derived from the Italian Wikipedia entry

Visiting 
The Casa dei Tre Oci is open Everyday from 10am - 7pm (closed on Tuesdays)

It is located on the island of Giudecca and is mostly easily reached by the Zitelle vaporetto stop.

TIckets cost €12 in person or €9 with the MyPass Venezia App.

The current on display is the Letizia Battaglia Exhibition until August 18, 2019.

References

Dei Tre Oci
Gothic Revival architecture in Italy
Houses completed in 1913
Dorsoduro